Tramecourt is a commune in the Pas-de-Calais department in the Hauts-de-France region of France.

Geography
Tramecourt is located 16 miles (22 km) east of Montreuil-sur-Mer on the D71 road and on the other side of the battlefield of Agincourt from the village and fortification of Azincourt, after which the battle was named.

Population

Places of interest
 The church of St. Léonard, dating from the sixteenth century
 The eighteenth-century chateau.

A commemorative memorial precedes the linden-lined driveway and its cross-driveways. The chateau is noted for its facades, roofs and courtyard. Other items worthy of note are the remains of the old castle and farm buildings, a dovecote, the horse-trough, located in the courtyard of farm, the walled vegetable garden, an ancient farm cart and the woodland park.

See also
Communes of the Pas-de-Calais department

References

Communes of Pas-de-Calais
Artois